The Hyundai Palisade is a mid-size crossover SUV manufactured by Hyundai Motor Company since late 2018. It replaces the Maxcruz (also known as Santa Fe XL outside of South Korea) as the flagship SUV under the Hyundai brand.

According to Hyundai, the name Palisade "references a series of coastal cliffs", the neighborhood of Pacific Palisades in Los Angeles, California is used as a reference for the naming of the car.

Overview 
The Palisade debuted at the 2018 Los Angeles Auto Show on November 28, 2018. Previously, the design of the Palisade was previewed by the Hyundai Grandmaster concept which debuted in June 2018. Like its predecessor, the Palisade features three rows of seating, with seating for up to eight passengers when equipped with a second-row bench seat or seven passengers with the optional second-row captain seat.

The vehicle rated a coefficient drag of 0.33, achieved with an optimised front cooling area with extended internal air guide, aerodynamic underside panels with full front and centre underbody covers, and rear wheel aero deflectors.

Introduction of the right-hand drive model started in December 2020 in Australia and Indonesia. CKD assembly in Russia started in 2020 by Avtotor for domestic sales.

Markets

North America 
Trim levels available for the Palisade in the United States and Canada are the base SE, SEL with optional Convenience Package or Convenience and Premium Package, Limited, and top-of-the-line Calligraphy (since 2021 model year). Powering all Palisade models is a 3.8-litre Atkinson cycle V6 engine with Idle Stop & Go (ISG).

South Korea 
In South Korea, the Palisade was launched on December 11, 2018. The South Korean pop-group BTS was chosen as the brand ambassador for the new model of Hyundai, and have since been involved in numerous commercials and ad campaigns in South Korea and America.

Philippines 
In the Philippines, the Palisade was launched in April 2019. It is only offered with 2.2-litre turbo-diesel engine and a 7-seat configuration.

Australia 
The Palisade was released in Australia and New Zealand in December 2020 for the 2021 model year, after the right-hand drive model was finalized. It is available in either 7- or 8-seater configuration on the Highlander trim and 8 seater on the standard trim. The Palisade is available with a choice of 3.8-litre V6 petrol front-wheel drive or 2.2-litre four-cylinder turbo-diesel all-wheel drive. Both engines are matched to 8-speed automatics.

Indonesia 
The Indonesian-market Palisade went on sale in January 2021 after December 2020 introduction. It is offered in Prime and Signature trim levels with all-wheel-drive available in the latter trim. It is only available with a 2.2-litre four-cylinder turbo-diesel engine mated to an 8-speed torque converter automatic transmission. Facelift model was released in July 2022.

Russia 
It is locally assembled at the Avtotor plant in Kaliningrad.

Malaysia 
The Malaysian-market Palisade was launched in December 2021. It is a fully imported model (CBU) from Hyundai's Ulsan plant and comes in two engine choice, 2.2-litre CRDi diesel and 3.8-litre Lambda II V6.

Facelift 
The updated Palisade debuted for the North American market at the New York International Auto Show on April 13, 2022, for the 2023 model year. It features a revised front end, and an enhanced infotainment system with 12-inch navigation.

In South Korea, the updated Palisade was released on May 19, 2022, following its physical release at the 2022 New York International Auto Show. High-definition 12.3-inch displays, LED headlamps, and smart cruise control is basically applied. The thickness of the sound-absorbing material was increased and the shock-absorbing device was improved. In addition, technologies such as Digital Key 2, second-row ventilation seats, and PCA-R were applied.

Powertrain

Sales

References

External links

Palisade
Cars introduced in 2018
Crossover sport utility vehicles
Mid-size sport utility vehicles
Front-wheel-drive vehicles
All-wheel-drive vehicles
2020s cars